Diastrophus potentillae, also known as the cinquefoil bud gall wasp, is a species of gall wasp in the family Cynipidae. It is found in eastern North America. It makes galls on the stems of Potentilla canadensis and P. simplex.

References

Further reading

 

Cynipidae
Hymenoptera of North America
Insects described in 1864
Taxa named by Homer Franklin Bassett
Articles created by Qbugbot